Thomas Gebauer (born 30 June 1982) is a professional footballer who plays as a goalkeeper for LASK. Born in Germany, he acquired Austrian citizenship in October 2012.

References

External links
 
 

1982 births
Living people
German footballers
Austrian footballers
Footballers from Bavaria
Association football goalkeepers
Regionalliga players
Austrian Football Bundesliga players
TSV 1860 Munich II players
SpVgg Bayreuth players
SV Ried players
LASK players
German expatriate footballers
German expatriate sportspeople in Austria
Expatriate footballers in Austria